The World Rugby Under 20 Trophy (known as the IRB Junior World Rugby Trophy until 2014) is an international rugby union competition. The event is organised by the sport's governing body, World Rugby, and is contested by 8 men's junior national teams with an under-20 age requirement. This event replaced the World Rugby's former age-grade world championships, the Under-19 and Under-21 World Championships.

The inaugural tournament was held in June 2008, hosted by Chile and with 8 teams participating.

The World Rugby Under 20 Trophy is the second level of the World Rugby tournament structure for under-20 national sides. At the same time that the Trophy was launched, World Rugby (then known as the International Rugby Board) also launched an upper-level championship, featuring 16 teams in 2008 and 2009 and a reduced format for 12 teams from 2010 and onwards.

Promotion and relegation between the Trophy and the Championship is in place. The winner of the Trophy will play in next year's Championship, while the last placed team at the Championship will be relegated to the Trophy for the next year.

History 
The inaugural tournament was held in 2008, hosted by Chile, and won by Uruguay. 
World Rugby's decision that the United States would host the tournament in 2012 was viewed as the United States taking a step closer towards hosting the Rugby World Cup.

Tournament results

Team records

Legend
 = Hosts
 = Champions (promoted to U20 Championship)
 = Champions (not promoted to U20 Championship)
 = Runners-up
 = Third place
 = Fourth place
WC = Competed in the U20 Championship
q = Qualified
- = Did not qualify

References

External links 
 U20 Trophy: The story so far at World Rugby

 
Under 20
Under-20 rugby union competitions